Rockin' with Judy Jetson (also known as Judy Jetson and the Rockers) is a 1988 animated made-for-television film produced by Hanna-Barbera for syndication as part of the Hanna-Barbera Superstars 10 series.

Plot
When intergalactic rock star Sky Rocker plays a concert at the Cosmic Coliseum, Judy Jetson and her friends Iona and Starr go into orbit. Starry-eyed Judy meets her idol and gives him a song she has written just for him, "Rockin' Round the Galaxy". But also at the concert are Quark and Quasar, bumbling henchmen to the evil, music-hating Felonia Funk. They are carrying a secret code that will unlock the powers of the Mental Flosser and enable Felonia to control the universe and banish music forever.

The secret code accidentally gets switched with Judy's song, and Sky unwittingly turns it into a new rock hit. A depressed Judy takes refuge at the Crater Club, where her father George, disguised as a punk-rocker, tries to save her from Sky. But Sky has already been kidnapped by Felonia, and then Judy disappears. Her captors, however, are the Zoomies, an outer-space race of party animals who love music and desires of vanquishing Felonia.

Felonia finds Judy and prepares to do away with her and Sky. They escape, but Felonia has already activated the Mental Flosser. Then Judy and Sky hit on the solution that will stop Felonia – music! They jam on Judy's song and send the beat vibrating around the galaxy. The sound overpowers the Mental Flosser and vanquishes Felonia. With the galaxy now safe, Sky resumes his tour, but as his real identity Billy Booster, with Judy as his new opening act.

Voice cast
Janet Waldo as Judy Jetson
Mel Blanc as Cosmo Spacely
Daws Butler as Elroy Jetson
Don Messick as Astro the Space Mutt, Additional Voices
George O'Hanlon as George Jetson
Penny Singleton as Jane Jetson
Jean Vander Pyl as Rosie
Charlie Adler as Quark, Zappy
Michael Bell as Quasar
P.L. Brown as High Loopy Zoomy
Steve Bulen as Additional Voices
Ruth Buzzi as Felonia Funk
Hamilton Camp as Mr. Microchips, Manny
Selette Cole as Rhoda Starlet
Peter Cullen as Gruff, Commander Comsat, Bouncer
Pat Fraley as Zilchy
Cindy McGee as Iona
Pat Musick as Starr, Fan Club President, Zowie
Rob Paulsen as Sky Rocker/Billy Booster, Zany
Eric Suter as Nicky Neuron
B.J. Ward as Zippy, Judy Jetson (singing voice)
Beau Weaver as Ramm Rocket, Dee-Jay

Musical numbers

 Songs by: William Hanna, Joseph Barbera, Thomas Chase, Steve Rucker, Todd Hayen, Charles M. Howell IV and John Debney
 "Rockin' 'Round the Galaxy" - Judy, Sky Rocker, Company, Zoomies
 "Airport Welcome" - Judy, lona, Starr
 "Jupiter Jump" - Sky Rocker
 "Gleep Glorp" - Sky Rocker, Judy, Iona, Starr
 "Shootin' Star" - Judy, lona, Starr, Sky Rocker, Gruff
 "Surfin' in Space" - Judy, lona, Starr, Zoomies
 "A House Is Not a Home" (unrelated to the Burt Bacharach song of the same name) - Judy, Ione, Starr, Zoomies

Home media
Hanna-Barbera Home Video released Rockin' with Judy Jetson on VHS on May 18, 1989, exactly 8 months, to the day, after it was first released in the USA on September 18, 1988. On August 9, 2011, Warner Archive issued a DVD in NTSC picture format with all region encoding, as part of their Hanna–Barbera Classics Collection. This is a Manufacture-on-Demand (MOD) release, available exclusively through Warner's online store and Amazon.com.

When released on Boomerang's streaming service, two additional scenes absent from the VHS issue are included, one of journalists being checked in at Sky Rocker's concert, the other an imagine spot showing Elroy's view of what home life would be like if Judy became a superstar.

References

External links
 
 Rockin' with Judy Jetson at the Big Cartoon Database

1988 television films
1988 animated films
1988 films
Films based on television series
Animated films based on animated series
The Jetsons films
Hanna-Barbera animated films
American television films
Hanna–Barbera Superstars 10
1980s American animated films
Television films based on television series
American children's animated comedy films
Films directed by Ray Patterson (animator)
1980s children's animated films
1980s English-language films